Event '76 is the seventh album of the jazz fusion band Area, and the second live album. It was recorded in Milan's Università Statale in 1976, though released in 1979. Ares Tavolazzi and Giulio Capiozzo are noticeably absent, as when this album was recorded, they had temporarily left the band, only to return a few months later.
This album is noticeable for featuring Steve Lacy on saxophone and Paul Lytton on percussion, and it is also noticeable for featuring a lengthy version of "Caos IIa Parte", which was split between the two sides of the LP due to time reasons. The live version of "Caos IIa Parte" was more improvised than the studio piece: each musician was given a sheet of paper in which there was written a word ("sex", "irony", "violence") and he had to interpret it for three minutes, then change sheet of paper. Each musician had a different sheet of paper.
The title track is a variation of the song "SCUM" from the album Maledetti (Maudits). An aftershow interview with Tofani, Fariselli and Stratos was released as a bonus track on some editions of Maledetti (Maudits). 
This was the last album of the classic era featuring Paolo Tofani (he left the band in late 1977, but returned in 2009), and Demetrio Stratos, who died some months after the release of this record.

Track listing

Side one

 "Caos Ia parte" – 20:15

Side two

 "Caos IIa parte" – 9:18
 "Event '76" – 9:27

Personnel
Patrizio Fariselli – prepared piano
Steve Lacy – soprano sax
Paul Lytton – percussions
Demetrio Stratos – vocals
Paolo Tofani – guitar, Tcherepnin synthesizer

References

Area (band) albums
1979 live albums